The Tianjin Library is a provincial-level public library located in the Hexi District of Tianjin City. Established in 1908, it is one of the first provincial public libraries in China.

Tianjin Library is one of the largest public libraries and a national first-level library in China.

History
The predecessors of Tianjin Library were Zhili Library (founded in the 34th year of Guangxu of the Qing Dynasty), Tianjin Municipal Library and the Former Tianjin Library, among which Zhili Library was the main one.  The library was renamed several times, and in 1982, it was renamed to its current name.

References

Libraries in China
Buildings and structures in Tianjin
Libraries established in 1908